Sakaler Rang (2009) is a Bengali film directed by Suvamoy Chattopadhyay. This was first movie of Suvamoy as a director. This budget of the film . Because of this reason Suvamoy had to take burden of almost all the departments of the film.

Plot
Prananath aspires to educate the children of his village and goes to the city to earn and send back money for books. Eventually, the village gets a school, but the locals are in for some shocking news.

Cast and crew

Cast
Taranga Sarkar as Prananath.
Paulomi DeSakina.
Monu Mukhopadhyay as Teacher.
Churni Ganguly as Bhabi.

Crew
Direction: Suvomoy Chattopadhyay
Producer: Srabanti (Dona) Das.
Music direction: Suvomoy Chattopadhyay
Lyrics: Suvomoy Chattopadhyay
Story: Suvomoy Chattopadhyay
Screenplay: Suvomoy Chattopadhyay
Editor: Suvomoy Chattopadhyay

References

2009 films
Bengali-language Indian films
2009 directorial debut films
2000s Bengali-language films